The 1963 Western Michigan Broncos football team represented Western Michigan University in the Mid-American Conference (MAC) during the 1963 NCAA University Division football season.  In their seventh and final season under head coach Merle Schlosser, the Broncos compiled a 2–7 record (2–4 against MAC opponents), finished in fifth place in the MAC, and were outscored by their opponents, 201 to 111.  The team played its home games at Waldo Stadium in Kalamazoo, Michigan.

The team's statistical leaders included Ken Barnhill with 668 passing yards, George Archer with 397 rushing yards, and Tom Patterson with 269 receiving yards. Halfback Allen Gibbs and end Bill Somerville were the team captains. End Bill Somerville received the team's most outstanding player award.

At the end of the 1963 season, Schlosser was reportedly hung in effigy twice, and The Holland Evening Sentinel reported that every player had signed a petition seeking his removal. Schlosser was fired as coach on December 28, 1963, and assigned to other duties in the physical education department. The team compiled a record of 28-33-3 in seven seasons under Schlosser.

Schedule

References

Western Michigan
Western Michigan Broncos football seasons
Western Michigan Broncos football